Jan Beneš may refer to:

 Jan Beneš (writer) (1936–2007), Czech writer, translator, publicist and screenwriter
 Jan Beneš (orienteer) (born 1987), Czech orienteering competitor
 Jan Beneš (footballer) (born 1982), Czech footballer
 Jan Beneš (rower) (born 1971), Czech Olympic rower

Fictional characters
 Jan Benes (Fantastic Voyage), the comatose scientist in Fantastic Voyage portrayed by Jean Del Val